Ian Taylor (born 1957) is a former Australian international lawn and indoor bowler.

In the 1996 World Outdoor Bowls Championship he won two bronze medals in the triples and fours.

He also won a silver medal in the fours with Stephen Anderson, Robert Ball and Steve Srhoy at the 1994 Commonwealth Games in Victoria.

References

1957 births
Australian male bowls players
Living people
Commonwealth Games medallists in lawn bowls
Commonwealth Games silver medallists for Australia
Bowls players at the 1994 Commonwealth Games
20th-century Australian people
Medallists at the 1994 Commonwealth Games